Azal Avia Cargo (Cargo Airline of the State Concern Azərbaycan Hava Yolları Azerbaijan Airlines) is a cargo airline based in Baku, Azerbaijan. It operates scheduled and charter cargo services within Azerbaijan and to other CIS countries. Its main base is Heydar Aliev International Airport, Baku.

History 

The airline was established in 1996 and is wholly owned by Azerbaijan Airlines.

Fleet 

The Azal Avia Cargo fleet includes the following aircraft (at March 2007):

2 Antonov An-12
1 Antonov An-26B
1 Ilyushin Il-76TD

Previously operated
1 Antonov An-32 (at August 2006)

See also
List of Azerbaijani companies
Baku Cargo Terminal

References 

Airlines of Azerbaijan
Airlines established in 1996